Dezső (Dé-zhuh) "Dan" Grósz (19 September 1898 – 13 March 1987) was a Jewish Hungarian footballer who played for Vác-Újbuda LTC, and earned two appearances for the Hungarian national team. Grósz played as a full-back for American Soccer League sides Brooklyn Wanderers and Philadelphia Field Club.

Professional Soccer career 
 Teams listed at right
 Appeared with Hungarian National Soccer Team in 1924 Paris Olympics

 19 international caps

Personal life 

 Born to Avram Grosz and Fani Schreiber on 19 September 1898 in Baja, Bacs-Kiskun, Hungary
 Had nine siblings – Sofia, Irene, Sari, Kornel, Josa, Jeno, Josef, Lajos, Sandor, Frigyes
 Served as Lieutenant in Royal Hungarian army 1916–1920, including in Romania, Bukovina and Russia
 Emigrated to United States (New York City) in 1926
 Naturalized US Citizen
 Married Jeanne Elise Alexander, New York stage actress, 31 January 1930
 Moved permanently to California 1943
 One child – Phyllis June Grosz; two grandchildren – Barry and Julie
 Post-soccer career – bank teller for Public National Bank 1932–1943, Bank of America 1943–1963

References

1898 births
1987 deaths
Hungarian footballers
Hungary international footballers
Brooklyn Wanderers players
Philadelphia Field Club players
American Soccer League (1921–1933) players
Association football defenders
Footballers at the 1924 Summer Olympics
Olympic footballers of Hungary